Leiocephalus cuneus, commonly known as the Leeward Islands curlytail, was a species of lizard in the family Leiocephalidae (curly-tailed lizard). It was native to Barbuda and Antigua.

References

Leiocephalus
Reptiles described in 1964
Taxa named by Richard Emmett Etheridge